American Casino is a 2009 documentary film about the American subprime mortgage crisis. It is directed and produced by Leslie Cockburn with Andrew Cockburn as co-producer.

The film premiered at the Tribeca Film Festival in New York City on May 2, 2009, and opened at the Roxie Theater in San Francisco on August 21 and at the Film Forum in New York City on September 2. The film features Phil Gramm, Henry Paulson, Ben Bernanke, Henry Waxman, Baltimore mayor Sheila Dixon, and financial writer Mark Pittman. As of September 29, 2009 the film has grossed $23,974.

Critical reception
Variety called the documentary a "searing expose" and Slant magazine described it as "revelatory."

References

External links
 
C-SPAN Q&A interview with Andrew and Leslie Cockburn about American Casino, January 3, 2010
www.americancasinothemovie.com, official website

2009 films
American documentary films
Works about the subprime mortgage crisis
2009 documentary films
Documentary films about economics
2000s English-language films
2000s American films